The 2015–16 Serie A1 is the 97th season of the Serie A1, Italy's premier Water polo league.

Team information

The following 14 clubs compete in the Serie A1 during the 2015–16 season:

Head coaches

Regular season (Prima Fase) 

Pld - Played; W - Won; D - Drawn; L - Lost; GF - Goals for; GA - Goals against; Diff - Difference; Pts - Points.

Season statistics

Top goalscorers

Number of teams by regions

See also
2015–16 LEN Champions League
2015–16 LEN Euro Cup

References

External links
 Italian Water Polo Federaration 

Seasons in Italian water polo competitions
Italy
Serie A1
Serie A1
2015 in water polo
2016 in water polo